Wooxie is a social networking website that opened in September 2009. Wooxie is based in Chicago, Illinois, and is operated by Jeff Knize.  The website allows users the chance to provide their standard updates with 155 character updates, slightly longer than most other microblogging websites. This is a form of microblogging that enables users to connect people with similar interests.

Users who access the website can change how their content is displayed as well. The website offers users the chance to Go Micro that will limit their character maximum to 155, while they can choose to Go Macro and post up to 1,440 characters in their update.

Unlike other social websites, Wooxie prevents users from creating spam based accounts so far as possible. This is done through the restrictions in place on categories. Unlike other social networking websites, Wooxie does limit users on the number of categories that they can post in. This reduces the number of spam accounts that is in place on this website.

In addition to the social media that it provides, Wooxie is a tool for online business promotion and provides several tools to assist in this purpose. The social media website doubles as an article directory, permitting users to add full articles as well as blog posts to their account. This website offers users the chance to promote their content to help boost their Google AdSense content and to shorten affiliate links, without losing money. This is done with an AdSense feature that is available for the articles that users have the ability to place on the website. Users can also choose to add 10 keywords that will link back to their website to help with search engine optimization.

Site Features

Privacy and Security

Message on Wooxie are available to the public, however the content can be protected. Additionally, anonymous users are prohibited accessing certain information about your profile without first logging in to review the content.

Photo Services

Wooxie provides its own photo service. Users have the ability to upload their photo content to their updates and this will attach to their account. They will then have the chance to mark each photo as a business photo or one that is personal. These photos can then be restricted to certain individuals, helping to secure private photo content.

References

External links
 

American social networking websites
Internet properties established in 2009